Maryland Wildlands are a group of public properties that are protected from logging or other activities in the state of Maryland.

The Maryland Wildlands Preservation System is the state's counterpart to the federal government's National Wilderness Preservation System. Protected properties are designated as state wildlands by the Maryland General Assembly. These wildlands are owned and managed by the Maryland Department of Natural Resources. Each tract overlaps with all or part of a state park, forest, wildlife management area, or other land unit of the Maryland Department of Natural Resources.

History 
In 1971, the Maryland State Legislature passed the Wildlands Protection Act, which began the program of protecting publicly owned areas. As of December 2018, 38 areas had been designated as Maryland Wildlands. representing  of Maryland Wildlands.

Properties

Garrett County 
Savage River State Forest
Big Savage Mountain Wildland (1973)
Bear Pen Wildland
Middle Fork Wildland
High Rock Wildland
Savage Ravines Wildland
South Savage Wildland
Upper White Rock Wildland
Backbone Mountain Wildland
Maple Lick Run Wildland
Puzzley Run Wildland

Allegany County 
Green Ridge State Forest
Deep Run Wildland
Maple Run Wildland
Potomac Bends Wildland
Rocky Gap State Park
Rocky Gap Wildland
Dan's Mountain Wildlife Management Area
Dan’s Mountain Wildland

Washington County 
Within the Sideling Hill Wildlife Management Area
Sideling Hill Wildland

Frederick County 
Cunningham Falls State Park
Cunningham Falls State Park Wildland

Frederick and Montgomery Counties 
Islands of the Potomac Wildlife Management Area
Islands of the Potomac Wildland

Baltimore County 
North Point State Park
Black Marsh Wildland
Gunpowder Falls State Park
Gunpowder Falls Wildland
Panther Branch Wildland
Sweathouse Branch Wildland
Mingo Branch/Bush Cabin Run Wildland
Soldiers Delight Natural Environmental Area
Soldiers Delight Wildland

Howard and Montgomery Counties 
Patuxent River State Park
Patuxent River Wildland

Prince George's County 
Belt Woods Natural Environment Area
Belt Woods Wildland (1997)

Calvert County 
Calvert Cliffs State Park
Calvert Cliffs Wildland
Parker’s Creek Wildlife Management Area
Parker’s Creek Wildland

St. Mary's County 
St. Mary's River State Park
St. Mary's River Wildland

Charles County 
Mattawoman Natural Environment Area
Mattawoman Wildland
Zekiah Swamp Natural Environment Area
Zekiah Swamp Wildland
Chapman State Park
Chapman Wildland

Caroline County 
Idylwild Wildlife Management Area
Idylwild Wildland

Worcester County 
Pocomoke River State Forest and/or Pocomoke River State Park
Pocomoke River Wildland
Cypress Swamp Wildland

Somerset County 
Cedar Island Wildlife Management Area
Cedar Island Wildland
Janes Island State Park
Janes Island Wildland

References

External links
The Maryland Wildlands Preservation System webpage at the Maryland DNR Website
State Wildland System webpage listing acreages and locations.